Ma Xiangjun (born 30 October 1964) is an archer from the People's Republic of China.

Ma represented China at the 1988 and 1992 Olympic Games, winning a team silver at the latter.

She competed in the 1986 Asian Games, winning a gold medal in the individual 70m event, a silver medal in the team event and a bronze medal in the individual 50m event.

In 1987, she became the first Chinese competitor to win a title at the World Archery Championships, winning the women's individual competition.

References

1964 births
Living people
Archers at the 1988 Summer Olympics
Archers at the 1992 Summer Olympics
Chinese female archers
Olympic archers of China
Olympic silver medalists for China
Olympic medalists in archery
Medalists at the 1992 Summer Olympics
Asian Games medalists in archery
Archers at the 1986 Asian Games
World Archery Championships medalists
Asian Games gold medalists for China
Asian Games silver medalists for China
Asian Games bronze medalists for China
Medalists at the 1986 Asian Games
20th-century Chinese women